Kwadwo Agymah Kamau is a Barbadian American novelist.

Life
A native of Barbados, he moved to New York in 1977.  He studied at Virginia Commonwealth University. He graduated from Baruch College of CUNY with a bachelor's degree in finance and a master's degree (1985) in quantitative economics.
He served first as a statistician at the New York City Department of Investigation, then as a senior economist at the New York State Department of Taxation & Finance. He studied with Paule Marshall at Virginia Commonwealth University in the MFA program.

His work has appeared in Callaloo, Caribbean Vibes, Gumbo, InSyte Magazine,
He teaches creative writing at the University of Oklahoma.

Awards
 2000: Virginia Governor's Award for the Arts nomination
 2000: Commonwealth of Virginia/Library of Virginia Literary Award
 2000: ForeWord Magazine's Book of the Year Award for Pictures of a Dying Man
 2000: Gustavus Myers Book Award, finalist for Pictures of a Dying Man
 2003: Whiting Award

Works

References

External links
Agymah Kamau profile at The Whiting Foundation
"Interview With Writer Agymah Kamau, Novelist and former economist with the state of New York", Odeo, Oct 26, 2006

20th-century male writers
20th-century novelists
Barbadian expatriates in the United States
Barbadian male writers
Barbadian novelists
Baruch College alumni
Living people
Male novelists
University of Oklahoma faculty
Virginia Commonwealth University alumni

Year of birth missing (living people)